Eivor, Eivør or Øyvor is a female given name in the Nordic countries. In Sweden, 4,922 people bear the name. The average age is 78.

The name perhaps originated from either the Proto-Norse word auja, which is thought to mean "good luck", or from Old Norse ey- or øy-, meaning "island", and secondly from -varr, meaning "careful", or perhaps from the Proto-Norse word *warjaʀ, meaning "defender". The Old Norse form of the name was Eyvǫr or Øyvǫr.

Notable people

Faroese
 Eivør Pálsdóttir (born 1983), known professionally as Eivør, Faroese singer-songwriter

Norwegians
 Øyvor Hansson (1893–1975), Norwegian politician

Swedes
 Eivor Alm
 Eivor Landström
 Eivor Olson
 Eivor Steen-Olsson

In popular culture
Eivor Varinsdottir, the protagonist of the 2020 video game Assassin's Creed: Valhalla.

References

Old Norse
Given names